The coast of Norway is 100,915 km long and there have been a total of 212 lighthouses along it, but no more than 154 have ever been operational at the same time. The first, Lindesnes Lighthouse, opened in 1655; the newest Lighthouse, Anda, was finished in 1932.

The first Lighthouses were private operations, but in 1821 the government made the Channel and Harbor Inspector responsible for Lighthouses in Norway. A dedicated Lighthouse Administration was set up in 1841. The Lighthouses are today mostly automated and since 1974, run by the Norwegian Coastal Administration.

Two lightvessels had been operated along the Norwegian coast. "Enigheden" off Ålesund from 1856 vas replaced with Lepsøyrev Lighthouse in 1879, and "Ildjernsflu" moored off Nesodden from 1914 until it was scrapped in 1968.

This list, while not complete, is sorted by location along the shipping lane from the border with Sweden in the south to Russia in the northeast. The Norwegian Coastal Administration maintains a total of 5,000 different navigational lights along the coast. This list covers only lighthouse stations.

Gallery: Norwegian lighthouses by county (fylke)

Østfold 
 Torbjørnskjær Lighthouse, Hvaler (1872)
 Homlungen Lighthouse, Hvaler (1867)
 Strømtangen Lighthouse, Fredrikstad (1859)
 Struten Lighthouse, Fredrikstad (1907)
 Guldholmen Lighthouse, Moss (1894–1984)

Akershus 
 Digerudgrunnen Lighthouse, Frogn (1871–1975)
 Steilene Lighthouse, Nesodden (1827)

Oslo 
 Heggholmen Lighthouse, Oslo (1827)
 Dyna Lighthouse, Oslo (1874)
 Kavringen Lighthouse, Oslo (1892)

Buskerud 
 Filtvet Lighthouse, Hurum (1840–1985)

Vestfold 
 Bastøy Lighthouse, Horten (1840–1986)
 Medfjordbåen Lighthouse, Tønsberg
 Torgersøy Lighthouse, Tønsberg (1851–1890)
 Fulehuk Lighthouse, Nøtterøy (1821–1989)
 Store Færder Lighthouse, Tjøme (1697–1857)
 Lille Færder Lighthouse, Tjøme (1857)
 Svenner Lighthouse, Larvik (1874)
 Stavernsodden Lighthouse, Larvik (1855)
 Tvistein Lighthouse, Larvik (1908)

Telemark 
 Langøytangen Lighthouse, Bamble (1839)
 Jomfruland Lighthouse, Kragerø (1839)
 Strømtangen Lighthouse, Kragerø (1874)
 Stavseng Lighthouse, Kragerø (1874)

Aust-Agder 
 Stangholmen Lighthouse, Risør (1855)
 Lyngør Lighthouse, Tvedestrand (1879)
 Ytre Møkkalasset Lighthouse, Arendal (1888–1986)
 Store Torungen Lighthouse, Arendal (1844)
 Lille Torungen Lighthouse, Arendal (1844)
 Sandvigodden Lighthouse, Arendal (1844)
 Rivingen Lighthouse, Grimstad (1886)
 Homborsund Lighthouse, Grimstad (1879)
 Saltholmen Lighthouse, Lillesand (1882)

Vest-Agder 
 Grønningen Lighthouse, Kristiansand (1878)
 Oksøy Lighthouse, Kristiansand (1832)
 Odderøya Lighthouse, Kristiansand (1832–1984)
 Songvår Lighthouse, Søgne (1888)
 Ryvingen Lighthouse, Mandal (1867)
 Hatholmen Lighthouse, Mandal (1867)
 Lindesnes Lighthouse, Lindesnes (1655)
 Markøy Lighthouse, Lyngdal (1725–1844)
 Søndre Katland Lighthouse, Farsund (1878)
 Lista Lighthouse, Farsund (1836)

Rogaland 
 Lille Presteskjær Lighthouse, Sokndal (1895–1973)
 Vibberodden Lighthouse, Eigersund (1855–1977)
 Eigerøy Lighthouse, Eigersund (1854)
 Kvassheim Lighthouse, Hå (1912–1990)
 Obrestad Lighthouse, Hå (1873)
 Feistein Lighthouse, Klepp (1859)
 Flatholmen Lighthouse, Sola (1862)
 Tungenes Lighthouse, Randaberg (1828–1984)
 Kvitsøy Lighthouse, Kvitsøy (1700)
 Fjøløy Lighthouse, Rennesøy (1849)
 Vikeholmen Lighthouse, Karmøy (1849–1908)
 Høgevarde Lighthouse, Karmøy (1700–1902)
 Sørhaugøy Lighthouse, Haugesund (1846–1952)
 Skudenes Lighthouse, Karmøy (1799–1924)
 Geitungen Lighthouse, Karmøy (1924)
 Utsira Lighthouse, Utsira (1844)
 Røværsholmen Lighthouse, Haugesund (1892)

Hordaland 
 Ryvarden Lighthouse, Sveio (1849)
 Leirvik Lighthouse, Stord
 Slåtterøy Lighthouse, Bømlo (1859)
 Øksehamaren Lighthouse, Austevoll (1849–1918)
 Marstein Lighthouse, Austevoll (1877)
 Hellisøy Lighthouse, Fedje (1855)
 Holmengrå Lighthouse, Fedje (1892)

Sogn og Fjordane 
 Utvær Lighthouse, Solund (1900)
 Geita Lighthouse, Askvoll (1897)
 Ytterøyane Lighthouse, Flora (1881)
 Stabben Lighthouse, Flora (1867)
 Kvanhovden Lighthouse, Flora (1895)
 Hendanes Lighthouse, Vågsøy (1914)
 Ulvesund Lighthouse, Vågsøy (1870)
 Skongenes Lighthouse, Vågsøy (1870)
 Kråkenes Lighthouse, Vågsøy (1906)

Møre og Romsdal 
 Svinøy Lighthouse, Sande (1905)
 Haugsholmen Lighthouse, Sande (1876)
 Flåvær Lighthouse, Herøy (1870)
 Runde Lighthouse, Herøy (1767)
 Grasøyane Lighthouse, Ulstein (1836)
 Hogsteinen Lighthouse, Giske (1857–1905)
 Alnes Lighthouse, Giske (1853)
 Erkna Lighthouse, Giske (1869)
 Storholmen Lighthouse, Giske (1920)
 Lepsøyrev Lighthouse, Haram (1879)
 Hellevik Lighthouse, Haram (1880–1988)
 Ulla Lighthouse, Haram (1875)
 Ona Lighthouse, Sandøy (1867)
 Flatflesa Lighthouse, Sandøy (1902–1988)
 Bjørnsund Lighthouse, Fræna (1871)
 Kvitholmen Lighthouse, Eide (1842)
 Hestskjær Lighthouse, Averøy (1879)
 Stavnes Lighthouse, Averøy (1842)
 Grip Lighthouse, Kristiansund (1888)
 Tyrhaug Lighthouse, Smøla (1833)
 Skalmen Lighthouse, Smøla (1907)
 Haugjegla Lighthouse, Smøla (1922)

Trøndelag 
 Sletringen Lighthouse, Frøya (1899)
 Sula Lighthouse, Frøya, Sør-Trøndelag (1909)
 Vingleia Lighthouse, Frøya (1921–1985)
 Finnvær Lighthouse, Frøya (1912)
 Halten Lighthouse, Frøya (1875)
 Terningen Lighthouse, Hitra (1833)
 Børøyholmen Lighthouse, Hitra (1874–1970)
 Agdenes Lighthouse, Agdenes (1804–1984)
 Asenvågøy Lighthouse, Bjugn (1921)
 Kjeungskjær Lighthouse, Ørland (1880)
 Kaura Lighthouse, Roan (1931)
 Buholmråsa Lighthouse, Osen (1917)
 Kya Lighthouse, Osen (1920)
 Villa Lighthouse, Flatanger (1839–1890)
 Ellingråsa Lighthouse, Flatanger
 Gjeslingene Lighthouse, Vikna (1877)
 Grinna Lighthouse, Vikna (1904)
 Nordøyan Lighthouse, Vikna (1890)
 Prestøy Lighthouse, Nærøy (1841–1904)
 Nærøysund Lighthouse, Vikna (1904)
 Sklinna Lighthouse, Leka (1910)

Nordland 
 Bremstein Lighthouse, Vega (1925)
 Ytterholmen Lighthouse, Herøy (1912)
 Åsvær Lighthouse, Dønna (1876)
 Træna Lighthouse, Træna (1877)
 Myken Lighthouse, Rødøy (1918)
 Kalsholmen Lighthouse, Meløy (1916)
 Tennholmen Lighthouse, Gildeskål (1901)
 Bodø Lighthouse, Bodø (1875–1907)
 Landegode Lighthouse, Bodø (1902)
 Bjørnøy Lighthouse, Bodø (1890–1972)
 Måløy–Skarholmen Lighthouse, Steigen (1922)
 Flatøy Lighthouse, Steigen (1882–1966)
 Tranøy Lighthouse, Hamarøy (1864)
 Barøy Lighthouse, Ballangen (1903)
 Skrova Lighthouse, Vågan (1922)
 Moholmen Lighthouse, Vågan (1914)
 Rotvær Lighthouse, Lødingen (1914–1985)
 Skomvær Lighthouse, Røst (1887)
 Glåpen Lighthouse, Moskenes (1857–1985)
 Litløy Lighthouse, Bø (1912)
 Anda Lighthouse, Øksnes (1932)
 Andenes Lighthouse, Andøy (1859)

Troms 
 Hekkingen Lighthouse, Lenvik (1859)
 Torsvåg Lighthouse, Karlsøy (1916)
 Fugløykalven Lighthouse, Karlsøy (1920)

Finnmark 
 Fuglenes Lighthouse, Hammerfest (1859–?)
 Fruholmen Lighthouse, Måsøy (1866)
 Helnes Lighthouse, Nordkapp (1908)
 Slettnes Lighthouse, Gamvik (1905)
 Kjølnes Lighthouse, Berlevåg (1916)
 Makkaur Lighthouse, Båtsfjord (1928)
 Vardø Lighthouse, Vardø (1896)
 Bøkfjord Lighthouse, Sør-Varanger (1910)

External links 
 The Norwegian Lighthouse Society
 Protected Lighthouses in Norway
 Leuchtturmseiten von Anke und Jens